1050 Meta, provisional designation , is a stony Eunomia asteroid from the central regions of the asteroid belt, approximately  in diameter. It was discovered on 14 September 1925, by German astronomer Karl Reinmuth at the Heidelberg Observatory in southwest Germany. The meaning of the asteroids's name is unknown. The presumably S-type asteroid has a rotation period of 6.14 hours and possibly an elongated shape.

Orbit and classification 

Meta is a member of the Eunomia family, a prominent family of stony S-type asteroid and the largest one in the intermediate main belt with more than 5,000 members. It orbits the Sun in the central asteroid belt at a distance of 2.2–3.1 AU once every 4 years and 3 months (1,554 days; semi-major axis of 2.63 AU). Its orbit has an eccentricity of 0.18 and an inclination of 12° with respect to the ecliptic.

Naming 

Any reference of this minor planet's name to a person or occurrence is unknown.

Unknown meaning 

Among the many thousands of named minor planets, Meta is one of 120 asteroids, for which no official naming citation has been published.

Physical characteristics 

According to the overall spectral type for members of the Eunomia family, Meta is an assumed S-type asteroid.

Rotation period and poles 

In October 2006, a rotational lightcurve of Meta was obtained from photometric observations by French amateur astronomer René Roy. Lightcurve analysis gave a well-defined rotation period of 6.142 hours with a brightness amplitude of 0.46 magnitude, indicating that the asteroid has an elongated shape.

A modeled lightcurve using photometric data from the Lowell Photometric Database was published in 2016. It gave a concurring period of 6.14188 hours, as well as two spin axes at (60.0°, −42.0°) and (198.0°, −79.0°) in ecliptic coordinates (λ, β).

Diameter and albedo 

According to the surveys carried out by the Japanese Akari satellite and the NEOWISE mission of NASA's Wide-field Infrared Survey Explorer, Meta measures between 8.773 and 10.03 kilometers in diameter  and its surface has an albedo between 0.294 and 0.364.

The Collaborative Asteroid Lightcurve Link assumes an albedo of 0.21 – derived from 15 Eunomia, the namesake and parent body of the Eunomia family – and calculates a diameter of 10.53 kilometers based on an absolute magnitude of 12.2.

References

External links 
 Lightcurve Database Query (LCDB), at www.minorplanet.info
 Dictionary of Minor Planet Names, Google books
 Asteroids and comets rotation curves, CdR – Geneva Observatory, Raoul Behrend
 Discovery Circumstances: Numbered Minor Planets (1)-(5000) – Minor Planet Center
 
 

001050
Discoveries by Karl Wilhelm Reinmuth
Named minor planets
19250914